Serampore Ramesh Chandra Girl's High School is a girls' school in Serampore City in the Indian state of West Bengal (Hooghly District). This school is affiliated to West Bengal Board of Secondary Education.

References

Girls' schools in West Bengal
High schools and secondary schools in West Bengal
Schools in Hooghly district
Serampore
Educational institutions established in 1879
1879 establishments in India